Narkar is a surname. Notable people with the surname include:

Avinash Narkar, Indian actor
Sunil Narkar (born 1961), American actor, writer, producer, and philanthropist
Vasant Narkar, Indian film director and writer
Aishwarya Narkar, Indian actor and producer